Mohammadabad-e Sofla may refer to:
 Mohammadabad-e Sofla, Fars
 Mohammadabad-e Sofla, Kerman
 Mohammadabad-e Sofla, Razavi Khorasan
 Mohammadabad-e Sofla, South Khorasan